Wood Old Homestead, also known as Bob Evans Farm is the farm in Bidwell, Ohio, near the city of Rio Grande, where Bob Evans and his wife Jewell lived for nearly 20 years, raising their six children.  The large brick farmhouse was a stagecoach stop, an inn, and now serves as a company museum.  It  features exhibits about Bob Evans Restaurants, the Homestead, and local history.  There is a reconstruction of the original steakhouse, company television commercials, and life-size dioramas and memorabilia of the Evans family.  The farm is currently owned by Golden Gate Capital, which acquired the farm as part of its 2017 purchase of the Bob Evans Restaurant division from Bob Evans Farms, Inc.

The farm also features the Adamsville Village, a 19th-century log cabin village, trails, and opportunities for camping, horseback riding, canoeing and special events.  The farm is still a working farm.  There is an annual Bob Evans Farm Festival. The Bob Evans Restaurant on the farm is open year-round.

References

External links
 Bob Evans Farm Homestead Museum

Houses on the National Register of Historic Places in Ohio
Federal architecture in Ohio
Houses completed in 1820
Museums in Gallia County, Ohio
National Register of Historic Places in Gallia County, Ohio
Food museums in the United States
Farm museums in Ohio
Open-air museums in Ohio
Biographical museums in Ohio
Industry museums in Ohio
Houses in Gallia County, Ohio